The play-offs of the UEFA Euro 2020 qualifying tournament decided the last four teams that qualified for the UEFA Euro 2020 final tournament, to be staged across Europe in June and July 2021. Unlike previous editions, the participants of the play-offs were not decided based on results from the qualifying group stage. Instead, 16 teams that failed to qualify through their group were selected based on their performance in the 2018–19 UEFA Nations League. The sixteen teams were then divided into four paths, each containing four teams, with each play-off path featuring two single-leg semi-finals and one single-leg final. The four play-off path winners joined the twenty teams that had already qualified for UEFA Euro 2020. The matches were originally scheduled for March 2020, but were postponed to 8 October and 12 November 2020 by UEFA due to the COVID-19 pandemic in Europe.

Format
With the new play-off format, the qualifying process guaranteed that at least one team from each division of the previous Nations League season would qualify for the final tournament.

The 16 teams were selected based on their performance in the 2018–19 UEFA Nations League. These teams were divided into four paths, each containing four teams, with one team from each path qualifying for the final tournament. Each league would have its own play-off path if at least four teams were available. The Nations League group winners then qualified automatically for the play-off path of their league. If a group winner had already qualified through the conventional qualifying group stage, they were then replaced by the next best-ranked team in the same league. However, if there were not enough teams in the same league, then the spot went to the next best team in the overall ranking. However, group winners could not face teams from a higher league.

With the final tournament draw being held on 30 November 2019 prior to the play-offs, it was possible that some groups could not be finalised based on the hosts in the play-offs. In that case, a second draw would have taken place after the play-offs on 1 April 2020. However, UEFA confirmed the additional draw was not necessary after the identity of the 20 directly qualified teams and the 16 play-offs teams was known.

Team selection
Based on the Nations League rankings, the 16 selected teams were chosen as follows, starting with League D and working up to League A:

 All available group winners were selected.
 If a group winner had already qualified through the UEFA Euro 2020 qualifying group stage, they were replaced by the next best-ranked team from the same league that had not also already qualified.
 If fewer than four teams from a given league had failed to qualify, then the remaining spaces for that league were allocated by the overall ranking:
 If the league had a group winner selected for the play-offs, then the next best team in the overall ranking from a lower league was selected.
 If the league had no group winner available, then the best team in the overall ranking was selected.

Path formation
The 16 selected teams were then allocated to paths of 4 teams. The draw to allocate teams to the different paths was subject to the following general conditions:

 Group winners could not form a path with a team from a higher league.
 If four or more teams from a league entered the play-offs, a path with four teams from the league in question had to be formed.
 Additional conditions may have been applied, subject to approval, including seeding principles and the possibility of final tournament hosts having to be drawn into different paths.

With these conditions, the draw procedure was as follows, starting with League D and working up to League A:

 Form a path with four teams from the same league.
 If there were more than four teams qualified in a given league, draw which teams would participate in the play-off path of that league.
 Remaining teams were drawn into a path of a higher league.

If there were no teams from League A (i.e. they all qualified directly for the final tournament), then this procedure would result in four teams from lower leagues being allocated to the path of League A.

Match pairings and rules
Each play-off path featured two single-leg semi-finals and one single-leg final. In the semi-finals of each path, based on the Nations League rankings, the best-ranked team hosted the lowest-ranked team, and the second-ranked team hosted the third-ranked team. The host of the final was decided during the 22 November 2019 draw, chosen between the winners of the semi-final pairings.

The play-offs were played in single-leg knockout matches. If scores were level at the end of normal time, 30 minutes of extra time was played. If the scores remained tied, a penalty shoot-out was used to determine the winner.

The UEFA Executive Committee approved the use of the video assistant referee system for the qualifying play-offs during their meeting in Nyon, Switzerland on 4 December 2019.

Effects of the COVID-19 pandemic
Due to the COVID-19 pandemic in Europe, the UEFA Executive Committee approved on 24 September 2020 the following principles for the UEFA Euro 2020 qualifying play-offs:
Each team could use a maximum of five substitutions, with a sixth allowed in extra time. However, each team was only given three opportunities to make substitutions, with a fourth opportunity in extra time, excluding substitutions made at half-time, before the start of extra time and at half-time in extra time.
If a group of players of a team were placed into mandatory quarantine or self-isolation following a decision from national or local health officials due to positive SARS-CoV-2 tests, the match would go ahead as scheduled as long as the team had at least 13 players available (including at least one goalkeeper).
If a team could not field the minimum required number of players due to positive SARS-CoV-2 tests, the match would be rescheduled at a later date to be decided by the UEFA administration, including May or June 2021 preceding the start of the UEFA Euro 2020 final tournament. Additionally, UEFA could have the venue reassigned to a neutral UEFA member association if deemed appropriate.
If any member of the appointed referee team had to be replaced due to positive SARS-CoV-2 test, UEFA could exceptionally appoint a match official of the same nationality as one of the teams and/or not on the FIFA list.

On 1 October 2020, UEFA announced the partial return of spectators to matches beginning in October 2020, restricted to a maximum of 30 percent of the respective stadium capacity. However, the return of spectators was subject to the decision of local authorities, with regional limits (including requirements for matches to be played behind closed doors) taking precedence over UEFA's maximum allowed capacity. Away supporters were not allowed at the venues. Social distancing was mandatory for spectators, and additional precautionary measures (such as face masks) were implemented in accordance with local regulations.

Teams selected
The team selection process determined the 16 teams that competed in the play-offs based on a set of criteria. Teams in blue advanced to the play-offs.

Key

Draw
The qualifying play-off draw took place on 22 November 2019, 12:00 CET, at the UEFA headquarters in Nyon, Switzerland. The draw followed the [[UEFA Euro 2020 qualifying play-offs#Path formation|path formation rules]] to determine the play-off paths that the non-group winners would participate in. Four separate draws determining the host of the play-off final of each path also took place between the winners of the semi-final pairings (identified as semi-final 1 for 1 v 4, and semi-final 2 for 2 v 3).
Due to the specificity of the draw, the procedure could only be finalised following the conclusion of the qualifying group stage. Depending on the combination of teams entering the play-offs, one or more draws may have been required to complete the formation of the play-off paths. While UEFA set the following general principles for the draw, none were ultimately necessary:
 Competition-related reasons: In order to give host teams a fair chance to qualify for the final tournament, they may have allocated to different paths when possible.
 Prohibited clashes: A number of prohibited clashes were also identified by UEFA, preventing matches between various pairs of teams for political reasons. If it were not possible to keep the teams in separate paths (e.g. they were both group winners from the same path), the conditions to play the match would have needed to be defined (e.g. playing the match at a neutral venue and/or behind closed doors).
 Possible seeding: Seeding may have been necessary depending on the specific combinations of teams that advanced to the play-offs.
Based on the 16 teams that advanced to the play-offs, the four play-off paths were formed following the path formation rules, starting with League D and working up to League A:
As there were four teams from League D (all group winners), they were all placed in Path D.
As there were seven teams from League C (three group winners and four non-group winners), the three group winners were placed in Path C, while a draw decided which of the four non-group winners was also placed in Path C.
As there were four teams from League B (one group winner and three non-group winners), they were all placed in Path B.
As there was one team from League A (non-group winner), it was placed in Path A. The three non-group winners from League C not drawn to Path C were then placed in Path A.

The following four non-group winners from League C (ordered by Nations League ranking) took part in the draw, with one being drawn into Path C, while the remaining three were allocated to Path A:

The team drawn into Path C occupied position C4, while the three teams drawn into Path A occupied positions A2, A3 and A4, following their Nations League ranking.

The following was the composition of the play-off paths:

Key

The following semi-final winners were drawn to host the play-off final:
 Path A: Winner semi-final 2 (Bulgaria v Hungary)
 Path B: Winner semi-final 1 (Bosnia and Herzegovina v Northern Ireland)
 Path C: Winner semi-final 2 (Norway v Serbia)
 Path D: Winner semi-final 1 (Georgia v Belarus)

With host Scotland in Path C, and two other hosts Hungary and Romania to be drawn into Path A or C, it was not possible to prevent one of these paths from containing two host teams. Therefore, the winner of the path with two hosts had to be assigned to two final tournament groups.

Schedule
The semi-finals took place on 8 October 2020, while the final matches took place on 12 November 2020. The semi-final and potential final hosts had until 20 December 2019 to confirm their venue.

The initial fixture list was published by UEFA on 22 November 2019 following the draw. Originally, the semi-finals were scheduled to take place on 26 March 2020, while the final matches would take place five days later on 31 March. However, the play-offs were postponed by UEFA on 17 March 2020 due to the COVID-19 pandemic in Europe. Afterwards, UEFA tentatively scheduled for the matches to take place on 4 and 9 June 2020. However, the play-offs were later postponed indefinitely by UEFA on 1 April 2020. The scheduling of the play-offs was reviewed by the UEFA Executive Committee during their meeting on 17 June 2020. At the meeting, UEFA decided to stage the play-offs in October and November 2020. To facilitate this, an additional matchday was added to both international windows, allowing for triple-headers to be played in order to complete the league phase of the 2020–21 UEFA Nations League as scheduled. The changes to the International Match Calendar for October and November 2020 were approved by the FIFA Council on 25 June 2020.

Times are CET/CEST, as listed by UEFA (local times, if different, are in parentheses). Kick-off times were generally 20:45, with some exceptions at 18:00 based on the local time zone.

Path A
The winner of Path A, Hungary, entered Group F in the final tournament. If Romania had won Path A, they would have instead entered Group C.

Bracket

Summary

|-
| colspan="3" style="text-align:center; background:whitesmoke;" | Semi-finals

|-
| colspan="3" style="text-align:center; background:whitesmoke;" | Final

|}

Semi-finals

Final

Path B
The winner of Path B, Slovakia, entered Group E in the final tournament.

Bracket

Summary

|-
| colspan="3" style="text-align:center; background:whitesmoke;" | Semi-finals

|-
| colspan="3" style="text-align:center; background:whitesmoke;" | Final

|}

Semi-finals

Final

Path C
The winner of Path C, Scotland, entered Group D in the final tournament.

Bracket

Summary

|-
| colspan="3" style="text-align:center; background:whitesmoke;" | Semi-finals

|-
| colspan="3" style="text-align:center; background:whitesmoke;" | Final

|}

Semi-finals

Final

Path D
The winner of Path D, North Macedonia, entered Group C in the final tournament. If Romania had won Path A, the winner of Path D would have instead entered Group F.

Bracket

Summary

|-
| colspan="3" style="text-align:center; background:whitesmoke;" | Semi-finals

|-
| colspan="3" style="text-align:center; background:whitesmoke;" | Final

|}

Semi-finals

Final

Goalscorers

Discipline
A player would have been automatically suspended for the next match for the following offences:
 Receiving a red card (red card suspensions could be extended for serious offences)

Yellow card suspensions from the qualifying group stage were not carried forward to the play-offs, finals or any other future international matches.

Goal of the Round
Following the semi-finals and finals, UEFA.com shortlisted four goals for users to vote on as "Goal of the Round", which was sponsored by SOCAR.

Notes

References

External links
UEFA Euro 2020, UEFA.com
European Qualifiers, UEFA.com
European Qualifiers play-off simulator, UEFA.com

Play-offs
Uefa Euro 2020 qualifying play-offs
Uefa Euro 2020 qualifying play-offs
2020 in Belarusian football
2020–21 in Bosnia and Herzegovina football
2020–21 in Bulgarian football
2020 in Georgian football
Hungary at UEFA Euro 2020
2020 in Icelandic football
2020–21 in Israeli football
2020–21 in Kosovan football
North Macedonia at UEFA Euro 2020
2020–21 in Northern Ireland association football
2020 in Norwegian football
2020 in Republic of Ireland association football
2020–21 in Romanian football
Scotland at UEFA Euro 2020
2020–21 in Serbian football
Slovakia at UEFA Euro 2020
Uefa Euro 2020 qualifying play-offs